Jason Greene (born February 2, 1988), also popularly known as Freckle or Aunt Freckle, is an American actor, internet personality, and model. On the webseries The Gay and Wondrous Life of Caleb Gallo, Freckle often delivers witty one-liners in a deadpan tone. They are also well known for Search Party and Everything Is Free.

Early life and education
Greene grew up with many half siblings. Greene had a passion for the performing arts, especially acting, since they were very young, acting out scenes with their older sister from a young age. They recount that even at Catholic middle school they were eager for roles, such as that of Jesus in The Last Supper.

When Greene auditioned to attend the competitive performing arts high school at the Los Angeles County High School for the Arts, they had not had any acting training, unlike many attendees. They taught themself the two monologues that they auditioned with, and they were admitted to the high school at 14 years old. They befriended artists such as pop artist Kesha at a young age and spent much time backstage at various artists’ performances at venues such as Spaceland and Echo. After graduating, Greene came to know Brian Jordan Alvarez, and encouraged Alvarez to make his now-popular internet videos, including skits such as "What Actually Happens When Gay Guys See Other Gay Guys and Straight People Aren't Around".

Also around the time of graduation, Greene received the Emerging Young Artist Award, which included a scholarship from the state of California. They used the scholarship to learn at studios including Groundlings, Meisner, and Alexander Technique.

Greene initially had a large stage presence, and was actually uncomfortable on camera at first.

At one point, Greene came into a large sum of money and spent a year not working; however, they ran out of funding after the year.

Career
Greene has stated that during high school and soon afterwards when starting their career, they were very confident that things would work out, especially given the prestige of their school and the award that they had received. When a visual artist was producing a documentary on their life, the friend reportedly quit and told Greene to "let [their] delusions fuel [them]," which Greene then took as advice, that one must believe in the impossible to succeed. Greene also cites the works of Esther Hicks as a source of confidence.

In their early career, Greene felt that their queerness stood in the way of obtaining roles. Greene had difficulty obtaining roles on television shows as a gay person, as their image was not one that networks wanted to broadcast to Middle America. Out of exasperation, they performed a joke audition for the television show American Idol, singing "I Touch Myself". The performance aired on national television and a clip was used in a commercial during the Super Bowl. The performance clip was also used in The Ellen DeGeneres Show, and Greene had an interview with Fox News on it.

Afterwards, Greene auditioned for and got parts on commercials for Doritos, PlayStation, and Magnum Ice Cream; however, the PlayStation ad never aired and Greene's performance was cut from the Magnum Ice Cream commercial.

After years of relative obscurity, Greene has enjoyed some recent internet success. Their role in The Gay and Wondrous Life of Caleb Gallo is considered to be their breakthrough role; Memes on blogging website Tumblr have helped them gain popularity. Greene has since been cast in roles in movies, television, music videos, and internet videos, occasionally even getting roles for trans characters.

Greene currently has a partnership with Fluide Beauty, a cosmetics company marketed to people of all genders, starring in a miniseries called Freckle Goes Fluide. Greene also has begun work with the visual journalism site Damn Joan, running "Ask Aunt Freckle".

Although Greene has been getting more roles as of late, they have stated that they would be content to remain an internet personality. Their main aspiration is visibility, whether or not major networks will have LGBTQ+ characters.

Greene has a close relationship to their fans, communicating frequently via social media platform Instagram. Fans have reached out to Greene from "redneck" environments far removed from Greene's native Los Angeles after having seen them online, an experience which Greene describes as "incredible".

Personal life
Greene identifies as genderfluid. They say they have identified as genderfluid for as long as they can remember and don't feel uncomfortable with their body, but rather have a "meta" experience with their gender. Having been born to socially liberal parents, Greene always felt free to express themself femininely. Greene's performance on hit TV show American Idol sparked many comments which opened their eyes to the varying social climate in the rest of America. They aim to be an example of genderfluid visibility.

Greene previously used the pronoun "it," both reclaiming a derogatory term for trans people and in reference to so-called "it girls". On social justice issues, they prefer an open dialogue. Religiously, Greene has a connection to Buddhism, Zen, and Daoism. They spent time studying chakras while becoming more emotionally available to improve their acting.

Freckle
The name itself of Freckle was created by Greene as a joking stripper name. Greene returned to the name at their first drag show, when they were asked by the drag queen onstage if they did drag. Greene cites the inspiration for the name as "a freckle in space is a star". Greene enjoys that the name Freckle is gender neutral. Greene had initially considered the name Freckle to be somewhat of a pet name, but now the name and character of Freckle have become part of Greene's identity.

The character of Freckle was conceptualized by Greene as an act brought to clubs and shows. Freckle was formed from the idea of a modern version of a flapper, with an inverse of the gender role reversal: whereas a flapper in the 1920s would have short hair and wear trousers, Greene's modern version was a boy growing his hair long and wearing a skirt. Greene had also wanted Freckle to be perceived as the type of person who had risen from virtually nothing to fame quickly, similar to Joan Crawford. Freckle was then developed at the improv comedy school the Groundlings as a circus runaway. Over the years, the character has developed alongside Greene, culminating in their current personality.

Greene describes Freckle as a "kind of… vaudeville, smoky, chanteuse, courtesan-concubine, you know, mistress of the dark, Silver Lake lady-boy" who was inspired by both their grandmother's class and by her "boozy, floozy" personality. Greene also cites as inspirations singers and silver screen-era actresses like Judy Garland, Bette Davis, and Joan Crawford. In addition, Greene describes Freckle as the sort of wacky aunt who often has a martini in hand. The character is primarily known from Greene's performance on the webseries The Gay and Wondrous Life of Caleb Gallo, however, the first video of Alvarez's that Freckle appeared in is one titled "When Your Gender Fluid Friend Gets More Attention from Straight Guys Than You".

Filmography and videography

References

External links 
 
 Freckle on Instagram

1988 births
Living people
American people of Mexican descent
American non-binary actors
Male actors from Los Angeles
Genderfluid people